The Kolmogorov Medal is a prize awarded to distinguished researchers with life-long contributions to one of the fields initiated by Andrey Kolmogorov.

The Kolmogorov Medal was first awarded in 2003 to celebrate 100 years since the birth of Kolmogorov. The recipient is invited to deliver a lecture. Early lectures were published in The Computer Journal.

Recipients 

The following people have received the Kolmogorov Medal:

Publications

See also

 List of mathematics awards

References 

Mathematics awards